"O sacrum convivium" is a Latin prose text honoring the Blessed Sacrament. It is included as an antiphon to Magnificat in the vespers of the liturgical office on the feast of Corpus Christi. The text of the office is attributed with some probability to Saint Thomas Aquinas.  Its sentiments express the profound affinity of the Eucharistic celebration, described as a banquet, to the Paschal mystery : "O sacred banquet at which Christ is consumed, the memory of his Passion is recalled, our souls are filled with grace, and the pledge of future glory is given to us."

Text
 Original Latin (punctuation from Liber Usualis)

 O sacrum convivium!
 in quo Christus sumitur:
 recolitur memoria passionis eius:
 mens impletur gratia:
 et futurae gloriae nobis pignus datur.
 Alleluia.

 Translation of original Latin

 O sacred banquet!
 in which Christ is received,
 the memory of his Passion is renewed,
 the mind is filled with grace,
 and a pledge of future glory to us is given.
 Alleluia.

Various settings

O sacrum convivium exists in Gregorian and Ambrosian chant forms.  Some of the many composers who have set the text are as follows:

Jacques Arcadelt
Gregor Aichinger
Hendrik Andriessen
Kim André Arnesen
Jason Bahr
Domenico Bartolucci
Giuseppe Antonio Bernabei
James Biery (With an alternate English text by Marilyn Biery)
Douglas Brooks-Davies 
Javier Busto
William Byrd
Giovanni Paolo Cima 
Giovanni Croce
Fredrik Sixten O Sacrum Convivium 
Don Michael Dice
Eugene E. Englert
Rolande Falcinelli
Richard Farrant
Andrea Gabrieli 
Noël Goemanne
Francisco Guerrero 
Marc-Antoine Charpentier, H.239 - 239 a, H.235, H.278 and H.240
Matthew Harris
Gabriel Jackson
Frank La Rocca 
Kenneth Leighton
Dan Locklair
Franz Liszt
Luca Marenzio
Frank Martin 
Peter Mathews
Olivier Messiaen's O sacrum convivium!
Vytautas Miškinis
Philip Moore
Cristóbal de Morales
Francisco J. Nunez
Don Lorenzo Perosi
Roger T. Petrich
Giovanni Pierluigi da Palestrina
Giovanni Battista Pergolesi 
Roberto Remondi
Alwin Michael Schronen
Fredrik Sixten
Steven Stucky
Jan Pieterszoon Sweelinck
Thomas Tallis 
Francisco Valls
Ludovico da Viadana
Tomas Luis de Victoria
Nicholas Wilton
Jules Van Nuffel
Ralph Vaughan Williams has a wordless chorus intone the chant melody in "Love Bade Me Welcome," the third of the Five Mystical Songs.
 Johann Emanuel Faulhaber (1772-1835) compositore della "Reggia Città di Louny" (Bohemia)
 Francisco José Carbonell (1985). His "O Sacrum Convivium" was awarded with the First Prize in the 2015 Chorus Austin Young Composers Competition.
Miguel Astor Salazar (1958)
«O Sacrum Convivium» (2018) Obra premiada en el VI Concurso Internacional Amadeus de Composición Coral.

References

External links

Medieval Latin texts
Latin-language Christian hymns
Works by Thomas Aquinas